Alfred Lergetporer (born 7 July 1909, date of death unknown) was an Austrian water polo player. He competed in the men's tournament at the 1936 Summer Olympics.

References

1909 births
Year of death missing
Austrian male water polo players
Olympic water polo players of Austria
Water polo players at the 1936 Summer Olympics
Place of birth missing